Mefalsim (lit. Road pavers) is a kibbutz in southern Israel. Located near the Gaza Strip and covering 11,000 dunams, it falls under the jurisdiction of Sha'ar HaNegev Regional Council.

History
The village was established in 1949 by members of the MAMLT youth movement, most of whom were immigrants from Argentina and Uruguay. It was named for the immigrants from Latin America who paved the way for others to make aliyah.

After the Israeli disengagement from Gaza in 2005, the kibbutz absorbed some of the evicted families. Since 2001, the kibbutz has been hit by dozens of rockets launched from the Gaza Strip, with a few buildings destroyed, including the kindergarten in 2012. In 2018, the village was the first location set ablaze by a fire balloon.

References

External links
Kibbutz website 
Living under the volcano of Gaza Euronews, 23 November 2012

Argentine-Jewish culture in Israel
Uruguayan diaspora in Israel
Kibbutzim
Kibbutz Movement
Populated places established in 1949
Gaza envelope
Populated places in Southern District (Israel)
South American-Jewish culture in Israel
1949 establishments in Israel